Anthidium loboguerrero is a species of bee in the family Megachilidae, the leaf-cutter, carder, or mason bees.

Distribution
Colombia

References

loboguerrero
Insects described in 2004